The African Socialist International (ASI) in the United States, is an organization set up by the African People's Socialist Party at that party's first congress, in 1981. The resolution for the organization's creation called for all African socialists to unite into one all-African socialist movement, with the eventual goal of one African state. The African People's Socialist Party considers the ASI to be its most important project.

The African People's Socialist Party envisions the ASI to be a more revolutionary organization than the general Pan-African movement. One of the resolutions of the African People's Socialist Party's Third Congress in September 1990 stated that:

See also
Uhuru Movement

References

African socialism
Pan-Africanist organizations